The Martin Lake Line is a railroad owned and operated by Texas Utilities and hauls Lignite coal from mines in the Oak Hill and Beckville area to the Martin Lake Power Plant and has a connection with the BNSF Railway's Longview Subdivision near Tatum, TX. Coal from the Powder River Basin in Wyoming is transferred onto the line via the connection with BNSF. The line was once electrified and operated incredibly rare GE E25Bs and Former Ferrocarriles Nacionales de México GE E60s, but the electrification looks to be dismantled and the locomotives replaced with SD70ACEs and SD50s.

Motive Power

References

Texas railroads
Coal in the United States
Mining railways in the United States
Transportation in Panola County, Texas
Vistra Corp